

Universities 
 Maharishi Mahesh Yogi Vedic University

Schools
H.D Memorial Higher Secondary School, Katni
 KCS girls school katni, Katni
 St. Paul's Senior Secondary School, Katni
 Sadhuram school Katni, Katni
 Saraswati higher secondary school, Katni
Syna International School, Katni
Jawahar Navodaya Vidyalaya, Badwara District. Katni (M. P.)
Maharishi Vidya Mandir, Dubey Colony, Katni
Bardsley Higher Secondary School,Katni
Delhi Public School, Katni
Kids Care Higher Secondary School, Katni

Coaching Institute

See also 
 
Katni